Lee Emerson Bellamy (May 15, 1927 – December 2, 1978) was an American music singer and songwriter. As Lee Emerson, he was manager for Marty Robbins, Bobby Helms, Jimmy C. Newman, and George Jones. He also was a songwriter for Robbins along with Joe Babcock and Jim Glaser.

Death
He was shot and killed by business associate and fellow songwriter  Barry Sadler, who was sentenced to 30 days in a Nashville workhouse for the killing.

Discography
So Little Time / Thank You My Darlin' 	Jan 1956 Lee Emerson And Marty Robbins
How Long Will It Be / I'll Know You're Gone  1956 Lee Emerson
It's So Easy For You To Be Mean / I Thought I Heard You Calling My Name  1956
I Cried Like A Baby Lee Emerson And Marty Robbins / Where D´Ja Go ?  1957
Start All Over / Do You Think 1957 - "Start All Over" covered by Bob Gallion 1960
Catch That Train / What A Night  1957	

Other songs 
I Thought I Heard You Calling My Name
"Ruby Ann"
"Goodbye Lonesome (Hello, Baby Doll)" (Lee Emerson) from Everybody Knows (Prairie Oyster album)

References

1978 deaths
American singer-songwriters
People murdered in Tennessee
1927 births
20th-century American singers
Deaths by firearm in Tennessee
American murder victims
Male murder victims
1978 murders in the United States